Small Point-Adam's Cove-Blackhead-Broad Cove is a town in the Canadian province of Newfoundland and Labrador, located in the Trinity-Conception Bay District north of Carbonear.

The town was incorporated in 1968 by amalgamating the independent fishing villages of Small Point, Adam's Cove, Blackhead and Broad Cove. The neighbouring community of Kingston was originally part of the amalgamation, but withdrew in 1976.

The town had a population of 414 in the Canada 2021 Census.

Demographics 

See also
 List of cities and towns in Newfoundland and Labrador

References 

Towns in Newfoundland and Labrador
1968 establishments in Canada